Stephen Bonsal (March 29, 1865 – June 8, 1951) was an American journalist, war correspondent, author, diplomat, and translator, who won the 1945 Pulitzer Prize for History.

Early life
Bonsal was born in Baltimore, Maryland, in 1865. He was educated at St. Paul's School in Concord, New Hampshire. He continued his studies in Heidelberg, Bonn, and Vienna. He married Henrietta Fairfax Morris in March 1900.  Bonsal traveled extensively. He claimed that he had visited all the countries of Europe, Asia (with the exception of Persia), and South America.

Journalist
Bonsal was later a special correspondent of the New York Herald (1885–1907), reporting the development of military conflicts including:

 Serbo-Bulgarian War, 1885
 Macedonian uprising, 1890
 First Sino-Japanese War, 1895
 Cuban insurrection, 1897
 Spanish–American War, 1898
 Chinese relief expedition, 1900
 Samar, Batangas, Mindanao, 1901
 Venezuela, Matas rebellion, blockage, 1903
 Russo-Japanese War, 1904–1905

He was a foreign correspondent for the New York Times in 1910–1911.

Diplomat
In 1891-1896, Bonsal served as secretary and chargé-d'affaire of the US diplomatic missions in Beijing, Seoul and Tokyo. He also served for a short time at the U.S. embassy in Madrid.

World War I
During World War I, Bonsal served in the American Expeditionary Forces with the rank of lieutenant colonel. Afterwards, he was President Woodrow Wilson's private translator during the 1919 Peace Conference in Paris.

Later life
Unfinished Business (1944), a diary describing his experiences during the Paris Peace Treaty negotiations and all the Allied infighting and waxing lyrical about the plight of the wounded veterans and their families, won him the 1945 Pulitzer Prize for History.

"No one else has presented the plight of the plain people of Europe, in relation to the strained secrecy of the Conference, and few have written of their agony as does Colonel Bonsal in terms so hardheaded and so poignant" (Time Magazine).

His second son, Philip Bonsal, was a career diplomat. Another son, Dudley Bonsal was a United States District Judge of the United States District Court for the Southern District of New York.

Selected works

Morocco as It Is (1894, W. H. Allen, London)
The Real Condition of Cuba Today (1897, Harper, New York, NY)
The Fight for Santiago (1899, Doubleday & McClure, New York, NY)
The Golden Horseshoe (1906, Macmillan, New York, NY)
The American Mediterranean (1912, Moffat and Yard, New York, NY)
Edward Fitzgerald Beale: A Pioneer in the Path of Empire, 1823–1903 (1912, Putnam, New York, NY)
Heyday in a Vanished World (1937, Norton, New York, NY) (autobiography)
Unfinished Business (1944, Doubleday, New York, NY) (1945 Pulitzer Prize for History)
When the French Were Here (1945, Doubleday, New York, NY)
Suitors and Supplicants (1946, Prentice-Hall, New York, NY)
The Cause of Liberty (1947, M. Joseph, London)

References

1865 births
1951 deaths
Morris family (Morrisania and New Jersey)
American diplomats
American newspaper reporters and correspondents
American political writers
Writers from Baltimore
United States Army personnel of World War I
Pulitzer Prize for History winners
War correspondents of the Russo-Japanese War
War correspondents of the Balkan Wars
American war correspondents
20th-century American translators
American male essayists
20th-century American essayists
20th-century male writers
20th-century American male writers
Historians from Maryland